Earth, initially credited as The Earth, was a British psychedelic music band active from 1968 to 1969. Black Sabbath changed the name of their hard-edged blues band Earth to Black Sabbath in order to avoid confusion with this band.

The line-up included The Misunderstood's Glenn Campbell on steel guitar and Robin Parnell on bass guitar. The band released two singles and recorded radio sessions for the BBC. After the second single Campbell disbanded Earth and formed Juicy Lucy.

Discography
The band's songs were written by David Bolitho:
 The Earth: "Everybody Sing the Song", B-side "Stranger of Fortune" Decca April 1969
 Earth: "Resurrection City", B-side "Comical Man" CBS December 1969

References

Musical groups established in 1968
Musical groups disestablished in 1969
British psychedelic rock music groups